Manolis Kalogerakis (born 12 March 1992) is a Greek professional footballer who plays as a goalkeeper for Super League 2 club Chania.

References

1992 births
Living people
Greek footballers
Gamma Ethniki players
Football League (Greece) players
Super League Greece 2 players
Doxa Drama F.C. players
Aris Thessaloniki F.C. players
Panionios F.C. players
Apollon Pontou FC players
Ergotelis F.C. players
Association football goalkeepers
Footballers from Chania